Thomas Monaghan (born 1997) is an Irish hurler who currently plays as left wing-forward for the Galway senior team.

Born in Craughwell, County Galway, Monaghan first played competitive hurling at juvenile and underage levels with the Craughwell club. He was educated at and played hurling with Athenry Vocational School before studying at Mary Immaculate College. Here Monaghan won back-to-back Fitzgibbon Cup medals.

Monaghan made his debut on the inter-county scene at the age of seventeen when he was selected for the Galway minor team. His tenure with the minor team culminated with the winning of an All-Ireland medal in 2015. He subsequently joined the Galway under-21 team but has so far been an All-Ireland runner-up in this grade. Monaghan made his senior debut for Galway during the 2017 Walsh Cup. Since then he has won one All-Ireland medal, one Leinster medal and one National Hurling League medal.

Career statistics

Honours

Mary Immaculate College
Fitzgibbon Cup (2): 2016, 2017

Galway
All-Ireland Senior Hurling Championship (1): 2017
Leinster Senior Hurling Championship (1): 2017
National Hurling League (1): 2017
All-Ireland Minor Hurling Championship (1): 2015

References

1997 births
Living people
Craughwell hurlers
Galway inter-county hurlers